Jeffery James Baca (born January 10, 1990) is a former American football center. He was drafted by the Minnesota Vikings in the sixth round of the 2013 NFL Draft. He played college football at UCLA.

Professional career

References

External links
UCLA Bruins bio
Minnesota Vikings bio
Career transactions

1990 births
Living people
Sportspeople from Mission Viejo, California
Players of American football from California
American football centers
American football offensive guards
American football offensive tackles
UCLA Bruins football players
Minnesota Vikings players
Cincinnati Bengals players
Dallas Cowboys players
San Diego Chargers players
Mission Viejo High School alumni